The Great Wall Peri is a city car produced by the Chinese automobile manufacturer Great Wall Motors.

Overview
The Peri is being sold in several countries of Asia. One of the main advantages against established European, American and other Asian rivals is the low cost of the Peri compared to these.

One of the reasons for the in comparison low retail price of the Great Wall Peri is that it is based heavily on older models by other manufactures. The entry-level motor is supplied by Mitsubishi and the interior resembles the second-generation Fiat Panda while the exterior strongly resembles the first-generation Nissan Note. The Great Wall Peri complies with the Euro-III emissions standard.

Peri 4x4/Haval M1
Great Wall also produce a crossover version called the Haval M1. It was previously known as the Peri 4x4.

Fiat Panda copy controversy
By December 2006, Italian automaker Fiat was considering taking legal action against Great Wall for copying their popular second-generation Panda as the Peri. Apart from the front end, the Peri was designed to look identical to the Panda inside and out.

On July 16, 2008, a Turin court upheld Fiat's claim and banned the Peri from being imported into Europe. In addition, the court order ruled that Great Wall Motors would pay Fiat a 15,000-euro fine for the first Peri imported, and an additional 50,000 euros for every subsequent car that was imported.

References

External links

Official website (archived)

City cars
Peri
2000s cars
2010s cars
Cars of China